Empty space may refer to:

Physics

 Outer space, especially the relatively empty regions of the universe outside the atmospheres of celestial bodies
 Vacuum, a volume of space that is essentially empty of matter, such that its gaseous pressure is much less than atmospheric pressure
 Free space, a perfect vacuum as expressed in the classical physics model
 Vacuum state, a perfect vacuum based on the quantum mechanical model
 In mathematical physics, the homogeneous equation may correspond to a physical theory formulated in empty space
Void, empty space.

Arts and literature

 Empty Space, a novel by M. John Harrison
The Empty Space, a 1968 book by the British director Peter Brook
 Empty Space Peter Brook Award, an annual prize awarded to a British theatre

Music

Albums
Empty Space, a 2003 album by Lycia
Empty Space, a 2011 album by Buckethead

Songs
"Empty Space" (song), a 2018 song by James Arthur
"Empty Space", a 2002 song by Lifehouse from Stanley Climbfall
"Empty Space", a 2007 song by Air Traffic from Fractured Life
"Empty Space", a 2013 song by The Story So Far from What You Don't See

See also
 Empty (disambiguation)
 
 Interstitial (disambiguation)
 Space (disambiguation)
 Void (disambiguation)
 Negative space, in typography